This List of operations of the South African Border War details the military operations conducted by the South African Defence Force during the South African Border War:

 Operation Savannah (1975)
 Operation Bruilof (1978)
 Operation Seiljag (1978)
 Operation Reindeer (1978)
 Operation Rekstok (1979)
 Operation Safraan (1979)
 Operation Sceptic (Smokeshell) (1980) 
 Operation Vastrap (July 1980)
 Operation Klipklop (1980)
Operation Winter (1980)
 Operation Wishbone SAAF Operation (December 1980)
 Operation Vasbyt (1981)
 Operation Konyn (1981)
 Operation Carnation (1981)
 Operation Protea (1981)
 Operation Daisy (1981)
 Operation Kerslig (1981)
 Operation Rekstok III SAAF Operation (March 1982)
 Operation Super (1982)
 Operation Meebos (1982)
 Operation Bravo (Angola) SAAF Operation (October 1982)
 Operation Maanskyn SAAF Operation (1983)
 Operation Drama (1983)
 Operation Phoenix (South Africa) (1983)
 Operation Skerwe SAAF Operation (1983)
 Operation Dolfyn (1983)
 Operation Karton (1983)
 Operation Klinker (1983)
 Operation Askari (1983)
 Operation Nobilis (1984)
 Operation Gordel  (1984)
 Operation Kabul  (1985)
 Operation Salamander (1985)
 Operation Boswilger (1985)
 Operation Egret (1985)
 Operation Argon (1985)
 Operation Magneto (1985)
 Operation Wallpaper (1985)
 Operation Cerebus (1985) 
 Operation Abrasion (1985)
 Operation Southern Cross (1986)
 Operation Alpha Centauri (1986)
 Operation Moduler (1987)
 Operation Firewood (1987)
 Operation Hooper (1988)  
 Operation Packer (1988)
 Operation Excite/Hilti (1988)
 Operation Prone (1988)
 Operation Vuiswys (1988)
 Operation Displace (1988)
 Operation Merlyn (1989)
 Operation Linger (1989)
 Operation Agree (1989)

 
South African Border Wars
Military operations involving South Africa